Sedu may refer to:

 Ewaldus Martinus Sedu (born 1963), Indonesian Roman Catholic bishop
 Lamassu, or Šêdu, an Assyrian deity

See also
 Sedus, a German office-furniture manufacturer